Kenneth Stanley Bochen (November 26, 1938 – November 18, 1999) was a Canadian football player who played for the Winnipeg Blue Bombers. He won the Grey Cup with them in 1959. After his football career, he worked for Molson Breweries. He died in 1999.

References

1938 births
1999 deaths
Edmonton Elks players
Players of Canadian football from Manitoba
Canadian football people from Winnipeg
Winnipeg Blue Bombers players